851 Squadron was a Royal Australian Navy Fleet Air Arm squadron. The squadron operated over two periods between 1954 and 1984, mainly in the training and transport roles.

History
851 Squadron was formed at HMAS Albatross based at RANAS Nowra as a land-based training and fleet support squadron on 3 August 1954. Its first commanding officer was Lieutenant D. Johns and it was initially equipped with Fairey Fireflies and C-47 Dakotas. It was tasked primarily with training pilots and observers on the Firefly, and in this role the squadron's Dakotas were used as an observer training platform; they were also used to provide a transport and communications capability. Throughout March 1956 the squadron was embarked upon HMAS Sydney, however, this was the squadron's only stint at sea as it was confined mainly to its training role.

The squadron was disbanded on 13 January 1958 following the reduction of the Royal Australian Navy's aircraft carrier fleet, which reduced the Navy's training requirements. It remained off the order of battle until it was re-formed at Nowra as a training and transport unit on 2 September 1968, equipped with Dakotas and Grumman Trackers. It also operated in the VIP and fleet requirements roles, with the latter role sometimes seeing the squadron undertake search and rescue tasks, as well as patrolling the Bass Strait to maintain security around the economically important oil facilities there. A detachment was also sent to operate out of Darwin and Broome, to undertake fishery protection patrols. The Dakotas were replaced by Hawker-Siddeley 748s in 1973.

The squadron amalgamated with 816 Squadron RAN in July 1982 before being disbanded for a second, and final, time on 31 August 1984.

Aircraft operated
The squadron operated the following aircraft:
 Fairey Firefly (August 1954 – January 1958);
 C-47 Dakota (August 1954 – January 1958, September 1968 – 1973);
 Grumman Tracker (September 1968 – August 1984); and
 Hawker-Siddeley 748 (1973 – August 1984).

See also
 851 Naval Air Squadron, RN

Notes

References
 
 

Flying squadrons of the Royal Australian Navy
Military units and formations established in 1954
Military units and formations disestablished in 1984